Albert Arnold Bennett (April 6, 1849 – October 12, 1909) was a Baptist missionary and hymn composer who founded the Baptist Theological Seminary of Yokohama, which later became Kanto Gakuin University.

Early life
Albert was born in Pennsylvania, United States, and was a very "gentle baby and child". Because of this both of his parents did not expect him to grow up.  Bennet's mother died when he was just seven. His father was a deacon of the Fifth Baptist Church of Philadelphia.  On Sundays their father would let the children go to play in a small city yard only one at a time.  Everyday toys were put away at this time.  But best of all, the children had much of their father's society.

Church life
Albert was baptized at the age of thirteen, and began to take part in church work. For instance, teaching in a mission school, calling on aged people and invalids, and conducting a weekly neighborhood meeting.

Kanto Gakuin University
After Albert sailed to Japan he decided to establish a university where all colors of skin could be taught. That was the Baptist Theological Seminary of Yokohama, which later became Kanto Gakuin University.

Family
Albert was married to Mela Isabel Barrows Bennett and had seven children; Charles, Andrew, Albert Jr., Bertha, Harriet, Edith and Raymond.

Death
Albert died in Yokohama in 1909. His gravestone bears the epitaph "He Lived to Serve".

References

Further reading

1849 births
1909 deaths
Baptist missionaries from the United States
Baptist missionaries in Japan
American Christian hymnwriters
Kanto Gakuin University
19th-century American writers
American expatriates in Japan
19th-century Baptists
University and college founders
The American Mathematical Monthly editors